This list of Moroccan people includes people who were born in Morocco and people who are of Moroccan ancestry, who are significantly notable for their life and/or work.

Academics 

Michel Abitbol, Moroccan-born Israeli historian, professor and chair of the Department of African Studies at the Hebrew University of Jerusalem.
Amyne E. Qasem, Moroccan economist
Robert Assaraf (1936–2018), Moroccan-born French historian
David Assouline, Moroccan-born French historian and politician
Moshe Bar-Asher (Moshe Ben Harush), Moroccan-born Israeli linguist and the president of the Academy of the Hebrew Language in Jerusalem.
Baruj Benacerraf (1920–2011), Venezuelan-born American immunologist, Nobel Prize in Physiology or Medicine
Paul Benacerraf, American philosopher working in the field of the philosophy of mathematics who has been teaching at Princeton University 
Shlomo Ben-Ami (born Shlomo Benabou), Moroccan-born Israeli scholar, diplomat and former politician
Samuel Benchimol (1923–2002), Brazilian economist, scientist and one of the leading experts on the Amazon region
Sara Bendahan (1906–1946), first Venezuelan woman to complete her medical studies in Venezuela
Alegría Bendayán de Bendelac, Venezuelan philologist, professor, writer and poet
David Bensoussan, Moroccan-born Canadian historian, author, and educator
Georges Bensoussan, Moroccan-born French historian
Latifa El Bouhsini, Moroccan professor and scholar on the history of the Moroccan feminist movement and women's rights issues.
Nadia Bouras, Dutch historian
David Cazès, Moroccan Jewish writer and educator
Merieme Chadid, astronomer and researcher
Rajaâ Cherkaoui El Moursli, Moroccan nuclear physicist. Winner of a L'Oréal-UNESCO Award for Women in Science for her work on the Higgs Boson.
Sami Shalom Chetrit, Moroccan Israeli University professor, Hebrew poet and Peace activist.
Isaac Chocrón (1930–2011), Venezuelan economist, playwright and translator. 
Claude Cohen-Tannoudji, Algerian-born French physicist who won the 1997 Nobel Prize in Physics (with Steven Chu and William Daniel Phillips)
Henriette Dahan Kalev, Moroccan-born Israeli scholar, founder of the Gender Studies Program at Ben Gurion University.
Yossi Dahan, Moroccan-born Israeli scholar, law professor, and the Head of the Human Rights Division at the College of Law and Business.
Yvette Duval (née Benchettrit) (1931–2006), Moroccan-born French historian who specialized in North Africa during Antiquity.
 Latifa Elouadrhiri, Moroccan experimental physicist and researcher
Mahdi Elmandjra, Moroccan futurologist
 Zhor Gourram, Moroccan novelist and scholar on language, creativity and new media
Serge Haroche, Moroccan-born French physicist who was awarded the 2012 Nobel Prize for Physics 
 Saïda Hossini, Moroccan palaeontologist, specializing in frogs of the Pleistocene.
Eva Illouz, Moroccan-born Israeli scholar, professor of Sociology at the Hebrew University in Jerusalem.
Raphael Israeli, Moroccan-born Israeli scholar, Professor Emeritus of Middle Eastern, Islamic and Chinese history at the Hebrew University of Jerusalem.
 Asma Lamrabet, Moroccan doctor, scholar, Islamic feminist and author
Marcelle Machluf, Moroccan-born Israeli biologist, director of the Laboratory for Cancer Drug Delivery & Cell Based Technologies
Adnane Remmal, Moroccan biologist
Avraham Avi Simhon, Israeli economist
 Hourya Benis Sinaceur, Moroccan philosopher
Daniel Sivan, specialist of Hebrew language from Ben-Gurion University of the Negev
Moncef Slaoui, chief adviser of Operation Warp Speed
Mohammed Amine Smaili, theologian and author
Abdelhadi Tazi (1921–2015), scholar, writer, historian, and former Moroccan ambassador in various countries
Rachid Yazami, co-inventor of the lithium ion battery
Haim Zafrani, Moroccan historian, specialist of Moroccan and North African history and Mediterranean Jewish history

Activists 

Mustapha Adib, human rights activist
Reuven Abergel, Saadia Marciano and Charlie Biton, Moroccan-born Israeli activists, founders of the Israeli Black Panthers
Hélène Cazès-Benatar (1898–1979), Moroccan human rights activist and the country's first female lawyer
Fatna El Bouih, democracy activist who was imprisoned during the Years of Lead
Kacem El Ghazzali, secular blogger and activist
Carmen Elmakiyes, Amos, Israeli social and political activist, medical clown, and filmmaker
Lamya Essemlali, French environmental activist, chairperson of Sea Shepherd France 
Latifa Ibn Ziaten, French-Moroccan activist
Miriam Peretz (née Ohayon), Moroccan-born Israeli educator and activist
Mohamed Rabbae, Dutch-Moroccan politician and activist
Rudy Rochman, French-born Israeli-Jewish rights activist
Abraham Serfaty, prominent dissident, militant, and political activist
Mordechai Vanunu, Israeli activist
Aladdin Meier, Swiss-Moroccan activist

Actors 

Avital Abergel, Israeli actress
Ahmed Salah Abdelfatah, Dutch actor
Yael Abecassis, Israeli actress
Loubna Abidar, Moroccan actress
Morjana Alaoui, Moroccan actress
 Sanâa Alaoui, French-Moroccan actress
Fu'ad Aït Aattou, French actor
Achmed Akkabi, Dutch actor
Natacha Amal, Belgian actress
Oulaya Amamra, French actress
Najib Amhali, Moroccan-born Dutch stand-up comedian and actor
Reymond Amsalem, Israeli actress
Richard Anconina, French actor
Shiri Appleby, American actress
Moran Atias, Israeli actress
Aure Atika, French actress
Amal Ayouch (born 1966), stage and film actress
Mohammed Azaay, Moroccan-born Dutch actor
Lubna Azabal, Belgian actress
Shmil Ben Ari, Israeli actor
Samuel Benchetrit, French actor, scenarist, writer and director
Marc Bendavid, Canadian actor
Amador Bendayán, Venezuelan actor and comedian
Omar Berdouni, Moroccan actor
Raquel Bitton, singer, French actress, scenarist, writer, producer
Miri Bohadana, Israeli actress and TV presentator. 
Mohammed Chaara, Dutch actor
Emmanuelle Chriqui, Canadian actress
Philippe Clair (Charles Bensoussan), Moroccan-born French actor, director, producer and screenwriter
Paul Danan, British actor
Gérard Darmon, Algerian-born French actor. He was granted the Moroccan citizenship in 2012.
Nasrdin Dchar Dutch actor and presenter
Adam Deacon, British actor and rapper
Vincent Elbaz, French actor
Jérémie Elkaïm, French actor
Houda Echouafni, Moroccan actress
Mehdi El Glaoui, French actor
Ronit Elkabetz, Israeli actress
Ouidad Elma, French-Moroccan actress
Mamoun Elyounoussi, Dutch actor
Nabil Elouahabi, British actor
Nadia Farès, French actress
Nora Fatehi, Canadian actress and dancer who works in Indian cinema
Jenette Goldstein, American actress
 Tzachi Halevy, Israeli actor, singer and musician
 Evelin Hagoel, Moroccan-born Israeli actress
Touriya Haoud, Dutch actress
Maryam Hassouni, Dutch actress
Aharon Ipalé, Moroccan-born Israeli actor
Dana Ivgy, Israeli actress
Moshe Ivgy, Moroccan-born Israeli actor
Touriya Jabrane (Saadia Kraytif), Moroccan actress, theatre director and politician
Paul Karo, Australian actor
 Shlomi Koriat, Israeli actor and comedian
Yasmine Lafitte (Hafida El Khabchi), Moroccan-born French pornographic actress
Karen Lancaume (Karine Bach), French pornographic actress
 Inbar Lavi, Israeli actress
Danny Nucci, Italian-American actor
Mimoun Oaïssa, Moroccan-born Dutch actor
Mimoun Ouled Radi, Dutch actor
Zineb Oukach, Moroccan actress and model
Ze’ev Revach, Moroccan-born Israeli actor, comedian and director
Laila Rouass, British actress
Daniela Ruah, Portuguese-American actress
Agam Rudberg, Israeli actress and model
Nasser Saleh, Spanish actor
Rosalinda Serfaty, Argentinian actress
Leila Shenna, Moroccan former actress
Benjamin Siksou, French actor and singer
Noah Schnapp, American-Canadian actor
Saïd Taghmaoui, French and American actor
Elisa Tovati, French actress and singer
 Zineb Triki, French-Moroccan actress
Jake Weber, British actor
Roschdy Zem, French actor and director

Beauty pageant 

Linor Abargil, Israeli beauty pageant winner who was crowned Miss Israel 1998 and Miss World 1998.
Kim Edri, Israeli beauty pageant winner who runner-up at Miss Israel 2011
Sara Chafak, Finnish beauty pageant winner who was crowned Miss Finland 2012 and represented Finland in Miss Universe 2012
Halima Chehaima, Belgian beauty pageant winner who was crowned Miss Brussels 2007 and represented Belgium in Miss World 2007 
Maroua Kharbouch, Gibraltarian beauty pageant winner who was crowned Miss Gibraltar 2013 and was named at Miss World 2013 
Shani Hazan, Israeli beauty pageant winner who was crowned Miss Israel 2012, and represented Israel in Miss Universe 2012 
Mor Maman, Israeli beauty pageant winner who was crowned Miss Israel 2014

Business people and entrepreneurs 

Sylvain Abitbol, Canadian engineer and entrepreneur in the telecommunications industry as CEO of NHC Communications Inc
Abdeslam Ahizoune, businessman, the chairman and chief executive officer of Maroc Telecom
Aziz Akhannouch, businessman and current Minister of Agriculture
Modar Alaoui, Moroccan-American serial entrepreneur based in Silicon Valley, California in the United States
Nezha Alaoui, Moroccan entrepreneur and founder of the Mayshad brand
David Amar (1920–2000), Moroccan businessman, leader of the Moroccan Jewish community, politician, and philanthropist
Richard Attias, businessman, events producer, founder and former chairman of PublicisLive and presently the executive chairman of Richard Attias and Associates
Elie Azagury (1918–2009), Moroccan architect, considered the first Moroccan modernist architect
Bettina Banoun, Norwegian barrister and businesswoman
Alain J. P. Belda, Canadian-Moroccan businessman, former CEO of Alcoa
 Isaac Benayon Sabba, Brazilian entrepreneur, founder of the IB Sabbá Ltda. group and Petroleo Sabbá S.A.
 Yoshua Bengio, French-Canadian computer scientist, most noted for his work on artificial neural networks and deep learning
Othman Benjelloun, Moroccan businessman CEO of the BMCE
Albert "Aldo" Bensadoun, Moroccan-born Canadian businessman, founder and chief executive of the ALDO Group
Miriem Bensalah-Chaqroun, Moroccan businesswoman
 Dror Benshetrit, Israeli artist, designer and inventor based in New York City.
Babette Bensoussan, Australian author and competitive intelligence specialist, who has written several books on competitive intelligence and analysis.
Moses Bensusan, Canadian-American real estate developer CEO of Liberty Grande and Logictech Construction Group.
Jacky Ben-Zaken
Miloud Chaabi
Joseph Chetrit, Moroccan American real estate investor and developer
Salomón Cohen Levy, Venezuelan-Israeli engineer and a real estate businessman
Albert Dadon, Moroccan Australian businessman
Patrick Drahi, Moroccan businessman CEO of telecom group Altice
Victor Drai, Moroccan American night-club owner
Victor Elmaleh (1918–2014), Moroccan-born American businessman and real estate developer
Mahdi ElMandjra
Sonia Gardner (née Lasry), Moroccan American billionaire hedge fund manager and co-founder of hedge fund Avenue Capital Group.
Salwa Idrissi Akhannouch, businesswoman, the founder and CEO of the Aksal Group
Daniel Iffla, French financier and philanthropist
Amina Lahbabi-Peters, branding, marketing and Communication for Development specialist
Marc Lasry, Moroccan American billionaire hedge fund manager and co-founder and chief executive officer of hedge fund Avenue Capital Group
Maurice Lévy, Moroccan French businessman, CEO of Publicis
Sarah Saddouk, French-Moroccan, Head of Innovation and Strategy of BNC Publishing, entrepreneur.com
David Serero, French award-winning architect
Mostafa Terrab, businessman, current CEO of the Moroccan state-owned phosphate-mining company OCP
Ralph Toledano, French-Moroccan businessman
Sidney Toledano, French-Moroccan businessman, CEO of LMVH Fashion Group since February 2018, and former CEO of Fashion House Dior.

Comedians 

Ary Abittan, French stand-up comedian
Najib Amhali, Dutch-Moroccan stand-up comedian and actor
Rachid Badouri, Canadian-Moroccan stand-up comedian
Jamel Debbouze, French-Moroccan stand-up comedian, actor and producer
Hanane el-Fadili, Moroccan comedian and actress
Gad Elmaleh, French-Moroccan stand-up comedian, actor and producer
Anne Roumanoff, French humorist and actress
Élie Semoun, French stand-up comedian and actor

Directors and producers 

Dan Attias, American television director and producer
Nabil Ayouch, Moroccan French film director
Lisa Azuelos, French director
Jom Tob Azulay, Brazilian producer, director, writer, director of photography and soundman
Margot Benacerraf
Hicham Bennir, Canadian director cinematographer editor and photographer
Faouzi Bensaïdi
Jacques Bensimon, Canadian public film and television director, producer and executive in Canada
Houda Benyamina, French director
Simone Bitton
André Elbaz
Ronit Elkabetz, Israeli filmmaker, screenwriter, and actress
Shlomi Elkabetz, Israeli filmmaker, screenwriter, and actor
Olivier Dahan, French filmmaker
Ismaël Ferroukhi
Sanaa Hamri
Tala Hadid
Laila Marrakchi
Hakim Nouri
Michèle Ohayon, Academy Award-nominated film director, screenwriter and producer
Ayoub Qanir, Moroccan American film writer and director
Mohamed Reggab, film director
Heinz Tietjen
Abdelhadi Tazi
Eric Toledano, French filmmaker
Malika Zouhali-Worrall

Fashion (designers, models) 

Karima Adebibe, British model
Nora Attal, British model
Yigal Azrouël, Israeli American New York based fashion designer
Elena Benarroch, Moroccan-Spanish fashion designer
Sara Chafak, Finnish model, winner of Miss Finland 2012
Alber Elbaz, Moroccan-born Israeli fashion designer, who worked for the Lanvin house
Joseph Ettedgui, British-Moroccan retailer, designer and founder of the Joseph brand
Bouchra Jarrar, French haute couture fashion designer for Balenciaga and Lanvin
Shlomit Malka, Israeli fashion model and television host.
Paul Marciano, American-Moroccan fashion designer and co-founder of GUESS? Inc
Joe Mimran, Canadian-Moroccan fashion designer and entrepreneur
Pnina Tornai (Pnina Assis), Israeli fashion and wedding dress designer, reality and daytime TV personality
Imaan Hammam, Dutch fashion model of Moroccan and Egyptian descent

Historical figures 
Al-Marrakushi
Ahmed el Inglizi
Averroes (Abu El Walid Muhammad Ibn Ahmad Ibn Rushd)
David Levy Yulee
Judah ben David Hayyuj
Maimonides
Merieme Chadid
Mohammed El Ifrani
Moses Elias Levy
Mouha ou Hammou Zayani, military figure who played an important role in the fight against French colonials
Muhammad al-Idrisi
Muhammad al-Muqri
Muhammad Ben 'Abd al-Karim al-Khattabi
Muley Xeque (1566–1621), Moroccan noble who converted to Catholicism in the 16th century
Mohammed Abed Al-Jabri
Robert Purvis (4 August 1810 – 15 April 1898), American abolitionist in the United States
Samuel Pallache, Jewish merchant, diplomat and pirate who was sent as an envoy to the Dutch Republic in 1608
David Pallache, member of the Pallache family
Isaac Pallache, member of the Pallache family
Joseph Pallache, member of the Pallache family
Moses Pallache, member of the Pallache family
Solika, famous Jewish martyr of the 19th century
Ibn battuta, famous explorer
Tariq ibn Ziyad, famous Berber warrior
Yusuf ibn Tashfin, famous Berber warrior and leader
Estevanico, famous explorer

Islamic religious leaders 
Ahmad ibn Ajiba, 18th century Sufi saint
Muhammad al-Jazuli, 15th century Sufi leader of the Berber tribe of the Jazulah
Sidi Ahmed al-Tidjani, 18th century Sufi scholar, founder of the Tijaniyya Sufi order
Ahmad al-Ghumari, traditionalist and scholar of Hadith
Abdullah al-Ghumari, 20th century Muslim preacher, jurist and theologian
Abd al-Aziz al-Ghumari, 20th century Muslim scholar
Mohammed Moussaoui, Moroccan-born French Islamic theologist, president of the French Council of Muslim Faith
Muhammad Abu Khubza, Muslim theologian, jurist, bibliographer and linguist
Sidi Heddi, 13th century marabout

Jewish religious leaders 

Solomon Abudarham
Baruch Abuhassira
Yaakov Abuhassira
Israel Abuhassira, known as Baba Sali
Amram Aburbeh
Zechariah Aghmati
Samuel Albas
Isaac Alfassi, 11th-century Rabbi, Talmudist and posek
Shlomo Amar, Sephardic Chief Rabbi of Jerusalem
Raphael Ankawa
Shalom Arush, Moroccan-born Israeli Breslov rabbi and founder of the Chut Shel Chessed Institutions
Abraham Azulai
Raphael Isaiah Azulai (1743–1830), rabbi and Jewish scholar in Ancona, Italy
Elijah Benamozegh (1822–1900), Italian rabbi and Kabbalist, considered as one of Italy's most eminent Jewish scholars
Amram ben Diwan
David Ben Hassin
Dunash ben Labrat
David ben Shimon
Isaac Ben Walid (1777–1870), one of the greatest Moroccan rabbi
Raphael Berdugo
Salomon Berdugo
Yehuda Bibas
Shalom Buzaglo
Kotel Dadon
Makhlouf Eldaoudi, Hakham Bashi of the Jewish communities of Acre, Haifa, Safed and Tiberias (1889–1909).
Yisroel Meir Gabbai
Baruch Gigi, Moroccan-born Israeli rabbi and co-Rosh yeshiva of Yeshivat Har Etzion in Gush Etzion, south of Jerusalem.
Shimon Hakham (1843–1910), Bukharian rabbi, descendant of Yosef Maimon
Haim Ibn Attar
Issachar ben Mordecai ibn Susan
Abraham ibn Zimra
Jacob ben Reuben ibn Zur
Yaakov Israel Ifargan
Zion Levy
Yosef Maimon (1741–1822), Moroccan rabbi who took care of the Bukharian Jewish community in the late 18th, early 19th century.
David Messas
Chalom Messas
Haim Pinto
Yosef Yitzhak Shloush
David Rebibo, Moroccan-born American Rabbi
Yoshiyahu Yosef Pinto, Israeli Orthodox rabbi who leads a global organization called Mosdot Shuva Israel

Media (journalist, TV presenter, radio) 

Laïla Abid, Dutch-Moroccan journalist, presenter and news anchor
Esmaa Alariachi, Hajar Alariachi and Jihad Alariachi, Dutch-Moroccan presenters
Arthur (born Jacques Essebag), Moroccan-born French TV presenter, producer and comedian
Tristane Banon, French journalist and writer
Valérie Bénaïm, Moroccan-born French journalist, columnist, writer, TV presenter and radio host
Abdelkader Benali, Dutch-Moroccan writer and journalist
Robert Benayoun (1926–1996), Moroccan-born French film critic and author.
Ahmed Benchemsi
Sonia Benezra, Canadian TV and radio personality and actress
Ralph Benmergui, Moroccan-Canadian television and radio personality
Mohammed Benzakour, Dutch-Moroccan columnist, essayist, poet, politician and writer
Hassnae Bouazza, Dutch-Moroccan journalist, columnist, writer, translator, TV program maker
Karim Boukhari
Abdellah Dami, Dutch-Moroccan presenter, journalist, writer
Gilberto Dimenstein, Brazilian journalist (Moroccan mother)
Naima El Bezaz, Dutch-Moroccan writer, essayist, and journalist
Dudu Elharrar, Moroccan-born Israeli singer, music producer, actor and television and radio presenter.
Ruth Elkrief, French television journalist
Salim Jay
Najat Kaanache, Spanish cook and host of AMC Networks’ cooking series ‘’Cocina Marroqui’’
Driss Ksikes
 Liran Kohner-Geyor, Israeli model, actress and TV personality.
Ali Lmrabet
Omar Nasiri
James Poniewozik, American journalist, and television critic (Moroccan mother)
Ariel Wizman, French-Moroccan journalist, television personality, musician, DJ
Richard Wolffe, British journalist
Michaël Youn (Michaël Benayoun), French TV and radio personality, actor, singer, and comedian

Miscelleanous arts (other than music and cinema) 
 Albert Almoznino, Moroccan-born Israeli hand shadow artist.
Rachid Ben Ali
Mahi Binebine
Chaïbia
Pinchas Cohen Gan, Moroccan-born Israeli award-winning painter and mixed-media artist.
Noureddine Daifallah
Abdellah Derkaoui, cartoonist
Latifa Echakhch, French-Moroccan visual artist
Bouchta El Hayani
Mohamed Hamri
 Ikram Kabbaj, Moroccan sculptor artist.
Bouchra Khalili
Édouard Lock, Canadian dance choreographer and the founder of the Canadian dance group, La La La Human Steps
Radia Bent Lhoucine, Moroccan painter
Shuli Nachshon
Alberto Pinto, Moroccan-born French photographer and interior designer
Pokimane (born Imane Anys), Moroccan-Canadian Twitch streamer and YouTube personality 
Salah (dancer), French award-winning competitive hip-hop dancer
Daniel Siboni, Moroccan-born French photographer
Cyril Takayama, Japanese Illusionist

Musicians 

Armand Amar, French composer
Omer Avital, Israeli musician
Shlomo Bar, Israeli musician and singer of Mizrahi music
Henri Belolo, Moroccan-born French music producer active during the disco era
French Montana, Moroccan-born American musician
Faouzia, Moroccan-born Canadian musician
Ohad Benchetrit, Canadian musician
Chico Bouchikhi (Jalloul Bouchikhi), French musician and a co-founder of the Gipsy Kings
Avraham Eilam-Amzallag, Israeli musician
David Guetta, French DJ
Mahmoud Guinia, Gnawa music maâlem
Hassan Hakmoun, Los Angeles-based Moroccan Gnawa musician
Abdelkrim Rais (1912–1996), Moroccan writer and musician of traditional Andalusian music
Alain Macklovitch, Canadian DJ
Maurice Ohana, French composer
RedOne (Nadir Khayat), Moroccan-Swedish record producer/songwriter
Aziz Sahmaoui, Moroccan musician and vocalist specialized in the modern Gnawa music
Adil Takhssait, Canadian rap and hip hop musician
Adam Zindani

Singers

Moroccan Arabic/Berber music (traditional, folk) 

Najat Aatabou, Moroccan singer
Bouchaib Abdelhadi, American-Moroccan singer
Meryem Aboulouafa, Moroccan singer
Zainab Afailal, Moroccan singer of Andalusian music
Zohra Al Fassiya (Zohra Ben Hamou, 1905–1994), Moroccan classical singer of Malhoun music
Yosef "Jo" Amar (1930–2009), Moroccan-born Israeli singer of Mizrahi music
Mohamed Bajeddoub, acclaimed Moroccan artist of the traditional Andalusian music
Laarbi Batma (1948–1998), Moroccan singer, leader of Nass El Ghiwane
Habib Belk (Habib Belkziz), Moroccan gnawa singer-songwriter, and multi-instrumentalist
Mohamed Benomar Ziani, Moroccan singer and musician specialized in the Aita and Chaabi music
Raquel Bitton, French Singer
Saïda Charaf, Moroccan singer of Sahrawi music
Abdessadeq Cheqara (1931–1998), Moroccan musician and Andalusi singer
Abdelwahab Doukkali, singer-songwriter and composer
 Haja El Hamdaouia, Moroccan folk-singer
 Rhoum El Bakkali, Moroccan Sufi singer and musician, leader of Hadra Chefchaounia, an all-female Sufi musical group
 Mohamed El Hayani (1945–1996), Moroccan singer
Samy Elmaghribi (Salomon Amzallag, 1922–2008), Moroccan singer-songwriter and musician
Jedwan (El Mokhtar Jedouane), Moroccan singer of chaabi music
Nabyla Maan, Moroccan singer
Younes Megri, Moroccan singer, musician and actor
Reinette L'Oranaise (Sultana Daoud), Algerian singer of Arab-Andalusian music
Oum (Oum El Ghaït Bent el Sahraoui), Moroccan singer-songwriter
Avi Peretz (singer), Israeli singer of Moroccan music
 Mohamed Rouicha (1950–2012), Moroccan folk singer
 Naima Samih, Moroccan singer, one of Morocco's most acclaimed singer
 Mohammed El-Arabi Serghini, Moroccan classical singer and musician
Houcine Slaoui (Houcine Ben Bouchaïb, 1921–1951), Moroccan singer and composer

Moroccan music (RnB, pop) 

AnoGhan (Anouar EL Ghannam), Moroccan singer-songwriter
French Montana Moroccan-American rapper
Fayçal Azizi, Moroccan singer
OUBEL (Oussama Belhcen), Moroccan singer
Hamid Bouchnak, Moroccan singer
Karima Gouit, Moroccan singer, model and actress
Ahmed Chawki, Moroccan pop singer
Cheba Maria (Maria Zine), Moroccan singer of pop music
Cheb Kader (Kouider Morabet), Algerian-born Moroccan singer
Douzi (Abdelhafid Douzi), Moroccan singer
Boussouar El Maghnaoui
Mimoun El Oujdi (Mimoun Bakoush, 1950–2018), Moroccan singer of Raï music
Saida Fikri, Moroccan-born American singer of Moroccan music
Saad Lamjarred, Moroccan singer of Arabic pop music
Manal (Manal Benchlikha), Moroccan singer of Rap and Hip Hop music
Mr Sufian, Moroccan singer
Ahmed Soultan, Moroccan singer of Afro-Arabian Soul
Vigon (Mohsine Abdelghafour), Moroccan singer-songwriter, record producer, dancer and bandleader
Hindi Zahra, French-Moroccan singer

Moroccan Amazigh music 

Hassan Arsmouk, Moroccan singer of Amazigh (Tashelhit) music.
 Rkia Damsiria, Moroccan singer of Tashelhit music
 Khalid Izri (Khalid Yachou), Moroccan singer of Amazigh (Riffian) music
 Ammouri M'barek (1951–2015), Moroccan singer of Amazigh (Tashelhit) music
Fatima Tabaamrant, Moroccan singer of Amazigh (Tashelhit) music
 Aicha Tachinwit, Moroccan singer of Amazigh (Tashelhit) music
 Fatima Tihihit (Fatima Banou), Moroccan singer of Tashelhit music
Salima Ziani, Moroccan singer of Riffian music and activist

Arabic music (Tarab, Middle-East Arabic pop) 

Dounia Batma, Moroccan singer of Arabic pop music
Rajae Belmlih (1962–2007), Moroccan singer of Arabic pop music
Abdou Cherif, Moroccan singer
Sofia El Marikh, Moroccan singer
Laila Ghofran (Jamila Omar Bouamrout), Moroccan singer of Arabic pop music
Shatha Hassoun, Iraqi-Moroccan singer of Arabic pop music
Aziza Jalal, Moroccan singer
Rajaa Kasabni, Arabic singer, winner of the first season of the Arabic version of The X-Factor
Asma Lamnawar, Moroccan singer of Arabic pop music
Jannat (Jannat Mahid), Moroccan singer of Arabic pop music
Salma Rachid, Moroccan pop singer
Hoda Saad, Moroccan singer-songwriter and composer of Arabic pop music
Samira Said, Moroccan-Egyptian singer of Arabic pop music
 Yousra Saouf, Moroccan pop singer
 Ibtissam Tiskat, Moroccan pop singer

Rap (Moroccan, French or international) 

Appa (Rachid El Ghazoui), Dutch-Moroccan rapper 
Ali B (Ali Bouali), Dutch rapper and stand-up comedian
Isam Bachiri, Danish rapper and member of Outlandish
Farid Bang, born Farid El Abdellaoui, Spanish-born German rapper, songwriter, producer, CEO at Banger Musik Label
Faouzia, Moroccan-born Canadian pop singer
Canardo (Hakim Mouhid), French rapper
Cilvaringz (Tarik Azzougarh), Dutch rapper and hip hop producer associated with the Wu-Tang Clan
Dizzy DROS, rapper from Casablanca
DJ Izm (Tarik Ejjamai), Australian rapper, member of the Multi-Platinum ARIA Award-winning Australian hip hop band Bliss n Eso
Leila K (Laila El Khalifi), Swedish Eurodance singer and former rapper
La Fouine (Laouni Mouhid), French rapper
French Montana (Karim Kharbouch), American rapper

Israeli music 

Zehava Ben, Israeli singer of Mizrahi music
Ofir Ben Shitrit, Israeli singer
Eden Ben Zaken, Israeli singer
Maya Bouskilla, Israeli pop singer
Yosefa Dahari, Israeli singer of Mizrahi music
Yuval Dayan, Israeli singer of pop music
Alon De Loco (Alon Cohen), Israeli singer and music producer
Gad Elbaz, Israeli singer of Sephardic Jewish music
Esther Galil, Moroccan-born French-Israeli singer
Eyal Golan, Israeli singer of Mizrahi music
Ishtar (Esther Eti Bitton), Israeli singer of Mizrahi and Arabic pop music
Mor Karbasi, Israeli singer of Sephardic music
Kineret (Kineret Sarah Cohen), Israeli-American singer of Jewish music
Noa Kirel, Israeli pop singer
Daniella Lugassy, Israeli opera singer
Shiri Maimon, Israeli pop singer
Harel Moyal, Israeli pop singer
Netta Barzilai, Israeli singer, winner of the 2018 Eurovision contest
Kobi Peretz, Israeli singer of Mizrahi and pop music
Moshe Peretz, Israeli singer of Mizrahi and pop music
Kathleen Reiter, Canadian-Israeli pop singer, winner of the first season of The Voice Israel
Ninet Tayeb, Israeli singer and actress
Avi Toledano, Israeli singer of Mizrahi music
Haim Ulliel, Israeli singer of Mizrahi music

Western music 

Zak Abel, British singer
Amine (Amine Mounder), French-Moroccan R&B singer
Malika Ayane, Italian singer
Basim, Danish singer (Danish Representative In Eurovision Song Contest 2014)
Madison Beer, American pop singer and model
Najoua Belyzel, French pop rock/electronic singer
Nadja Benaissa, singer, songwriter and actress, member of No Angels
Amel Bent, French pop singer
Amelle Berrabah, British singer and member of girl band Sugababes
Isaac Bitton, drummer for Les Variations
Raquel Bitton, French-Moroccan singer
Soukaina Boukries, Moroccan pop singer
Cut Killer (Anouar Hajoui), French DJ, actor and hip-hop recording artist
Younes Elamine, Moroccan-born French singer-songwriter, music producer and entrepreneur
Rajae El Mouhandiz, singer, poet and producer
Empire I (Miriam Moufide), Jamaica-based British singer-songwriter and social activist
Sofia Essaïdi, French-Moroccan singer
Nadia Essadiqi, Canadian singer
Faouzia (Faouzia Ouihya), Moroccan-born Canadian singer
Fouradi (Mohamed and Brahim Fouradi), Dutch hip hop duo
Senna Gammour, German singer-songwriter and a member of the pop group Monrose
Amir Haddad, French-Israeli singer of pop music
Raphaël Haroche, French singer-songwriter and actor
Bilal Hassani, French singer
Elam Jay, Moroccan Swiss singer-songwriter 
Imad Kotbi, DJ and radio presenter
La Caution (Ahmed and Mohammed Mazouz), French hip-hop duo
Hind Laroussi, Dutch singer
Loreen (Lorine Zineb Nora Talhaoui), Swedish singer (winner of Eurovision Song Contest 2012) 
Malek (Malek Belarbi), French-Moroccan singer
Sofia Mestari, French singer
Édith Piaf (Édith Gassion), French cultural icon and France's greatest popular singer
R3hab (Fadil El Ghoul), Dutch-Moroccan DJ/producer
Sapho (Danielle Ebguy), Moroccan-born French singer
David Serero, French opera singer
Chico Slimani (Youssef Slimani), Moroccan British singer
Sliimy (Yanis Sahraoui), French pop musician
Wallen (Nawell Azzouz), French R&B singer
Brigitte Zarie, Canadian singer-songwriter and composer

Poets 
Mohammed Achaari
Mohammed ibn Mohammed Alami
Mohammed ibn Idris al-Amrawi
Muhammad Awzal, religious Berber poet from the 17th century
Kaddour El Alamy
Abdellatif Laabi
David Hassine, religious Jewish poet and Rabbi from the 17th century
Hemmou Talb, 18th century composer of poems in the Shilha Berber language

Kings and sultans

Ministers, politicians and public servants

Morocco 

Idriss Azami Al Idrissi, politician
Chadi Abdalla, Ambassador, Chadi Abdalla is an American ambassador for the Kingdom of Morocco who was appointed in December 2020 and is currently the youngest Ambassador in Africa. He currently resides in Washington D.C and works with the Biden Administration on political affairs.
André Azoulay, politician, counsellor to late king Hassan II and king Mohammed VI 
Driss Basri, politician who served as Interior Minister from 1979 to 1999
Aïcha Belarbi, Moroccan sociologist, women's rights activist and diplomat. She was ambassador to the European Union from 2000 to 2008.
Mohamed Benaissa, foreign minister
Mehdi Ben Barka, politician, head of the left-wing National Union of Popular Forces (UNPF) and opponent of Hassan II
Aziza Bennani, Moroccan academic and politician.
Jamal Benomar
Yahya Bennani, diplomat
Fadel Benyaich, Moroccan-Spanish politician and businessman, ambassador of Morocco in Spain
Leon Benzaquen (1928–1977), Moroccan personal doctor for King Mohammed V of Morocco, and the first Jewish minister after Morocco's independence.
Rachad Bouhlal, diplomat
Ahmed Boukhari, former agent of the Moroccan Secret Service
Asma Chaabi
Driss Debbagh, former ambassador and minister
Abdellatif Filali, foreign minister (1985–1989); prime minister (1994–1998)
Driss Jettou, Prime Minister (2002–present)
Omar Kabbaj, diplomat
Fatima Marouan (born 1952), politician, endocrinologist
Mohamed Mediouri, politician, personal security of Hassan II and his senior bodyguard
Aziz Mekouar, Moroccan diplomat, former Moroccan ambassador to the U.S
Abdelaziz Meziane Belfqih, civil servant and senior advisor of king Mohammed VI
Ahmed Osman, former party leader
Fathallah Oualalou, government minister
Abderrahim Qanir
Léon Sultan, French Algerian-born Moroccan lawyer, and politician, founder of the Moroccan Communist Party.
Mahjoub Tobji, retired Commandant of the Royal Moroccan Army
Abderrahmane Youssoufi, Prime Minister (1998–2002)

Israel 

Shai Abuhatsira
Aharon Abuhatzira
Eli Aflalo, Moroccan-born Israeli politician
Eli Alaluf, Moroccan-born Israeli politician
Roni Alsheikh
Jacques Amir
Shaul Amor
David Dudi Amsalem, Israeli politician
Haim Amsalem, French Algerian-born Israeli politician
Danny Atar
Ariel Atias
Shmuel Avital, Moroccan-born Israeli former politician who served as a minister responsible for social co-ordination from March 2001 to February 2002
Yosef Azran
Aryeh Azulai
David Azulai
Yinon Azulai, Israeli politician
Eli Ben-Dahan
Shlomo Benizri
Daniel Benlulu, Moroccan-born Israeli former politician
Daniel Ben-Simon, Moroccan-born Israeli politician
Ya'akov Ben-Yezri (1927–2018), Moroccan-born Israeli politician. He served as Israel's Minister of Health between 2006 and 2009.
David Bitan
Shlomo Bohbot
Yoni Chetboun
Meir Cohen
Yitzhak Cohen
Meirav Cohen
Nissim Dahan
David Danino (1924–1990), Moroccan-born Israeli politician
Yohanan Danino
Danny Danon
Eli Dayan
Shlomo Dayan
Aryeh Deri
Rafael Edri
Yaakov Edri
Gadi Eizenkot
Rafael Eldad, Moroccan-born Israeli diplomat
Karin Elharar
Mordechai Elgrably, Moroccan-born Israeli politician
Rafi Elul
Leah Fadida, Israeli politician
Avraham "Avi" Gabbay, Israeli businessman and politician
Sharren Haskel
Tzachi Hanegbi
Fleur Hassan-Nahoum, British-born Israeli politician and public servant
Asher Hassin
Avraham Kalfon
Moshe Karadi
Yehuda Lancry, Moroccan-born Israeli politician and previous ambassador to France and the United Nations
Yehiel Lasri, Moroccan-born Israeli physician and politician who currently serves as mayor of Ashdod
David Levy
Daniel-Yitzhak Levy, Spanish-Moroccan born Israeli politician
Jackie Levy
Maxim Levy
Orly Levy
Yitzhak Levy
David Magen
Rahamim Malul, Moroccan-born Israeli politician
Yoram Marciano
Ya'akov Margi, Moroccan-born Israeli politician
Eliyahu Moyal (1920–1991), Moroccan-born Israeli politician who served as a member of the Knesset for the Alignment between 1974 and 1981
Shuli Mualem
Aharon Nahmias
Yitzhak Navon
Amir Ohana
Asher Ohana
Shimon Ohayon
Amir Peretz
Rafael "Rafi" Peretz, Israeli Orthodox rabbi and politician
Yair Peretz
Yitzhak Peretz (politician born 1938)
Yitzhak Peretz (politician born 1936)
Zion Pinyan, Moroccan-born Israeli politician
Elad Ratson, Israeli diplomat and a Digital Diplomacy expert
Miri Regev (née Miriam Siboni), Israeli politician
Uri Sebag, Moroccan-born Israeli politician
Bechor-Shalom Sheetrit
Yifat Shasha-Biton, Israeli educator and politician. She held the post of Minister of Construction and Housing from 2019 to 2020.
Meir Sheetrit
Shimon Shetreet
Keti Shitrit, Moroccan-born Israeli politician
 Yoel Strick, Israeli General (Aluf) who commands the Ground Forces Command
Eli Suissa, Moroccan-born Israeli politician
Rafael Suissa, Moroccan-born Israeli politician
Avraham Toledano
Samuel Toledano (1929–1996), Moroccan-born Spanish Jewish community leader
Shmuel Toledano
Sami Turgeman (Shlomo "Sami" Turgeman), major general in the IDF and is the current commander of the IDF Southern Command
Yitzhak Vaknin
Yosef Vanunu, Moroccan-born Israeli economist and former politician who served as a member of the Knesset from 1992 until 1996
Yehonatan Yifrah

Elsewhere 

Mustafa Aberchán, Spanish politician leader of the political organization Coalition for Melilla.
Ahmed Aboutaleb, Moroccan-born Dutch politician, Mayor of Rotterdam
Davi Alcolumbre, Brazilian politician
Lolita Aniyar de Castro, Venezuelan teacher, lawyer, politician, and criminologist. She became the first Venezuelan woman to be elected as a senator to the National Congress of Venezuela. 
Khadija Arib, Dutch politician of the Labour Party serving as Speaker of the House of Representatives of the Netherlands since 2015.
Dalya Attar, American politician
Farid Azarkan, Dutch politician
Audrey Azoulay, French politician Minister of Culture since February 2016
Rachel Bendayan, Canadian politician
Abraham Bentes, Brazilian Army commander
Alima Boumediene-Thiery, French politician, member of the European Parliament (1999–2004), of the Senate of France (2004–2011), and member of the French Green party.
Rachida Dati, first woman from a non-European immigrant background to occupy a key ministerial position in the French Cabinet 
Tofik Dibi, Dutch politician
Kamal El-Hajji, British security official and civil servant, Serjeant-at-Arms of the House of Commons
Saïd El Khadraoui, Belgian politician
Myriam El Khomri, Moroccan-born French politician, current Minister of Labour
Sari Essayah, Finnish member of the European Parliament
John Fritchey, Democratic member of the Illinois House of Representatives, representing the 11th District (1996–present)
Bernard Guetta, French politician and journalist.
 Sir Joshua Abraham Hassan (1915–1997), Gibraltarian politician, and the first mayor and Chief Minister of Gibraltar.
Fatima Houda-Pepin, Canadian politician and a member of the National Assembly of Quebec
Leslie Hore-Belisha
Roger Karoutchi, French ambassador to the OECD and former secretary of state to the French prime minister
Ahmed Lakhrif, Moroccan politician who held the position of secretary of state for foreign affairs (2007–2008)
Waldemar Levy Cardoso
Ahmed Marcouch, Moroccan-Dutch politician and former police officer, civil servant and educator serving as Mayor of Arnhem since 2017.
Joël Mergui, Moroccan-born French Jewish dermatologist and community leader, serving as the president of the Israelite Central Consistory of France.
Mohammed Moussaoui, president of the French Council of Muslim Faith
Jorge Sampaio, Portuguese lawyer and politician who was the 18th president of Portugal (1996–2006) (Moroccan maternal grandmother)
Najat Vallaud-Belkacem, Moroccan-born French politician, became the first French woman to be appointed Minister of Education, Higher Education, and Research
Olga Zrihen, Moroccan-born Belgian politician

Royal Family members 
Lalla Meryem, daughter of Hassan II
Moulay Rachid, son of Hassan II
Lalla Latifa Hammou, mother of king Mohammed VI
Lalla Asma, daughter of Hassan II
Lalla Hasna, daughter of Hassan II
Moulay Abdallah, brother of Hassan II
Moulay Hicham, son of Moulay Abdallah
Lalla Zineb, daughter of Moulay Abdallah
Lalla Abla bint Tahar, wife of Mohammed V and mother of Hassan II

Sportspeople

Archery 
Jonathan Ohayon, Canadian archer

Athletism 

Abderrahman Ait Khamouch, Spanish-Moroccan Paralympic athlete
Saïd Aouita
Hasna Benhassi
Abdellah Béhar
Nezha Bidouane
Brahim Boulami
Hind Dehiba
Hicham El Guerrouj
Driss El Himer
Nawal El Moutawakel
Yousef El Nasri, Spanish retired long-distance runner
Sari Essayah, Finnish retired race walker 
Ilias Fifa, Spanish-Moroccan long-distance runner
Jaouad Gharib
Bouchra Ghezielle
Salah Hissou
Adil Kaouch
Abderrahman Ait Khamouch, Spanish paralympic athlete
Khalid Khannouchi, Moroccan American marathoner
Brahim Lahlafi
Driss Maazouzi
Adel Mechaal, Spanish middle-distance runner
Abdelaziz Merzougui, Spanish runner
Mohamed Ouaadi
Muncef Ouardi, Canadian speed skater
Zahra Ouaziz
Rashid Ramzi
Ismaïl Sghyr
Khalid Skah
Achraf Tadili, Canadian runner competing over 800 meters
Mounir Yemmouni
Kamal Ziani, retired Spanish long-distance runner
Bouchra Ghezielle, French-Moroccan track and field athlete

Basketball 
Omri Casspi, Israeli basketball player
Yogev Ohayon, Israeli basketball player
Sophian Rafai, French-Moroccan basketball player
Amit Simhon, Israeli basketball player

Boxers 
Abdelhak Achik
Mohammed Achik
Najib Daho
Yassine El maachi
Ismael El Massoudi, French boxer
Karim El Ouazghari, Spanish boxer
Ali Hallab
Driss Moussaid
Mahdi Ouatine
Nordine Oubaali, French-Moroccan boxer
 Mohammed Rabii, Moroccan boxer
Khalid Rahilou, French former professional boxer
Tahar Tamsamani
Hassan Saada, Moroccan boxer

Chess 
Thal Abergel, French chess Grandmaster

Cyclism 
Henry Ohayon, Israeli cyclist

Fencing

 Lydia Hatuel-Czuckermann, Moroccan-born Israeli Olympic fencer
 Ayelet Ohayon, Israeli Olympic fencer

Footballers 

Zakariya Abarouai, French football player
Yassine Abdellaoui, Dutch-Moroccan football player
Yacine Abdessadki, French-Moroccan football player
Luciano Abecasis, Argentine football player
Laurent Abergel, French football player
Youssef Adnane, French-Moroccan football player
Ibrahim Afellay, Dutch football player
Achmed Ahahaoui, Dutch-Moroccan football player
Ismail Aissati, Dutch-Moroccan football player
Jamel Aït Ben Idir, French-Moroccan football player
Karim Aït-Fana, French-Moroccan football player
Jamal Akachar, Dutch-Moroccan football player
Zakaria Alaoui, football player
Rachid Alioui, French-Moroccan football player
Mustapha Allaoui, football player
Mohammed Alí Amar, Spanish football player
Ahmed Ammi, Dutch-Moroccan football player
Nordin Amrabat, Dutch football player
Mohamed Amsif, German-born Moroccan football goalkeeper 
Kamal Anis, Moroccan football player
Mimoun Azaouagh, Moroccan-born German footballer
Karim Azizou, French-Moroccan football player
Nabil Baha, French-Moroccan football player
Otman Bakkal, Dutch-Moroccan football player
Said Bakkati, Dutch-Moroccan football player
Yacine Bammou, French-Moroccan football player
Nacer Barazite, Dutch-Moroccan football player
Abdelaziz Barrada, French-Moroccan football player
Michaël Chrétien Basser
Chahir Belghazouani, French-Moroccan football player
Younès Belhanda, French-Moroccan football player
Aziz Ben Askar, French football player
Medhi Benatia, French-Moroccan football player
Yossi Benayoun, Israeli football player
Larbi Benbarek, Moroccan football player
Ismaël Bennacer, French football player
Younes Bnou Marzouk, French-Moroccan football player
Rachid Bouaouzan, Dutch-Moroccan football player
Elbekay Bouchiba, Dutch-Moroccan football player
Aziz Bouderbala, football player
Sofiane Boufal, French-Moroccan football player
Kamel Boughanem, French-Moroccan football player
Samir Boughanem, French-Moroccan football player
Khalid Boulahrouz, Dutch-Moroccan football pla
Nourdin Boukhari, Dutch-Moroccan football player
Mourad Bounoua, French-Moroccan football player
Ali Boussaboun, Dutch-Moroccan football player
Dries Boussatta, Dutch-Moroccan football player
Mbark Boussoufa, Dutch-Moroccan football player
Khalid Boutaïb, French-Moroccan football player
Said Boutahar, Dutch-Moroccan football player
Ben Butbul, Israeli football player
Mehdi Carcela-Gonzalez (Spanish father, Moroccan mother)
Samir Carruthers, Israeli football player
Kamel Chafni, French-Moroccan football player
Aatif Chahechouhe, French-Moroccan football player
Abdelhali Chaiat, Dutch-Moroccan football player
Khalid Chalqi, Moroccan-born French football player
Marouane Chamakh, French-Moroccan football player
Mohammed Chaouch, football player
Issam Chebake, football player
Mehdi Courgnaud, French football player
Manuel da Costa (footballer) (Portuguese father, Moroccan mother)
Karim Dahou, French football player
Kenza Dali
Guy Dayan, Israeli football player
Roei Dayan, Israeli football player
Anouar Diba, Dutch-Moroccan football player
Kieran Djilali, British football player
Olivier Echouafni, French football player
Issam El Adoua, football player
Karim El Ahmadi, Dutch-Moroccan football player
Youssef El Akchaoui, Dutch-Moroccan football player
Ahmed El Aouad, French-Moroccan football player
Youssef El-Arabi, French-born football player
Yassin El-Azouzi, French-Moroccan football player
Hakim El Bounadi, French-Moroccan football player
Faouzi El Brazi, football player
Samir El Gaaouiri, Dutch-Moroccan football player
Mustafa El Haddaoui, football player
Mounir El Haimour, French-Moroccan football player
Oualid El Hajjam, French football player
Mounir El Hamdaoui, Dutch-Moroccan football player
Karim El Idrissi, French-Moroccan football player
Faysal El Idrissi, French-Moroccan football player
Shavit Elimelech, Israeli football player
Alharbi El Jadeyaoui, French-Moroccan football player
Moestafa El Kabir, Dutch-Moroccan football player
Badr El Kaddouri
Abdelhamid El Kaoutari, French football player
Aziz El Khanchaf, French-Moroccan football player
Ali El Khattabi, Dutch-Moroccan football player
Abdou El-Kholti, French football player
Bouchaib El Moubarki
Karim El Mourabet, French-Moroccan football player
Samir El Moussaoui, Dutch-Moroccan football player
Ali El-Omari, French-Moroccan football player
Moha
Tarik Elyounoussi
Nabil El Zhar, French football player
Saïd Ennjimi, Moroccan-born French football player
Hen Ezra, Israeli football player
Karim Fachtali, Dutch-Moroccan football player
Omer Fadida, Israeli football player
Fayçal Fajr, French-Moroccan football player
Mohammed Faouzi, Dutch-Moroccan football player
Marouane Fellaini
Rayan Frikeche, French-Moroccan football player
Mustapha Hadji
Youssef Hadji
Youssouf Hadji, Moroccan football player
Samir Hadji, French-Moroccan football player
Anouar Hadouir, Dutch-Moroccan football player
Achraf Hakimi, Spanish-Moroccan football player
Adil Hermach, French-Moroccan football player
Golan Hermon, Israeli football player
Samy Houri, French-Moroccan football player
Lyes Houri, French-Moroccan football player
Youssef Idrissi, French-Moroccan football player
Younès Kaabouni, French football player
Younès Kaboul, French football player
Abderrahman Kabous, French-Moroccan football player
Ahmed Kantari, French-Moroccan football player
Sakina Karchaoui, French female football player
David Keltjens, Israeli football player
Houssine Kharja, Moroccan football player
Younes Khattabi, Moroccan rugby league player
Avi Knafo, Israeli football player
Zakaria Labyad
Hoda Lattaf, French female football player
Amine Lecomte, French football player
Moshe Lugasi, Israeli football player
Nassir Maachi, Dutch-Moroccan football player
Mouaad Madri, French-Moroccan football player
Zinédine Machach, French football player
Riyad Mahrez, French-Moroccan football player
Mehdi Messaoudi, French-Moroccan football player
Mourad Mghizrat, Dutch-Moroccan football player
Smail Morabit, French-Moroccan football player
Yassin Moutaouakil, French football player
Chafik Najih, French football player
Noureddine Naybet
Mounir Obbadi, French-Moroccan football player
Leila Ouahabi, Spanish-Moroccan football player
Amine Oudrhiri, French football player
Yacine Qasmi, French-Moroccan football player
Adil Rami, French football player
Adil Ramzi
Adrien Regattin, French football player
Walid Regragui, French-Moroccan football player and manager
Hamid Rhanem, French football player
Youssef Safri 
Karim Safsaf, French football player
Romain Saïss, French football player
Hamza Sakhi, French-Moroccan football player
Victor Sarusi, Israeli football player
Salaheddine Sbai, football player
Youssef Sekour, French-Moroccan football player
Tarik Sektioui, football player
Khalid Sinouh, Dutch-Moroccan football player
Hassan Souari, football player
Mounir Soufiani, French football player
Tomer Swisa, Israeli football player
Adel Taarabt, Moroccan football player
 Idan Tal, Israeli football player
Farid Talhaoui, French football player
Mehdi Taouil, French football player
Eitan Tibi, Israeli football player
Karim Touzani, Dutch-Moroccan football player
Yoann Touzghar, French football player
Smahi Triki, football player
Badou Zaki
Merouane Zemmama
Roei Zikri, Israeli football player
Hakim Ziyech, Dutch-Moroccan football player
Abdellah Zoubir, French football player
Niv Zrihan, Israeli football player

Ice hockey 
Josh Tordjman, Canadian ice hockey goaltender

Kickboxers 

Cyril Abidi, Savate Champion and Muay Thai World Champion
Badr Hari, K-1 Heavyweight champion and K-1 World GP 2008 finalist
Chalid Arrab
Faldir Chahbari
Chahid Oulad El Hadj
Aziz Jahjah

Martial artists 
Karim Ghajji, French kickboxer and B-boy
Lee Lamrani Ibrahim "Lightning" Murray, cage fighter turned gangster (Moroccan father, English mother)
Khalid Ismail, MMA-fighter
Zakaria Moumni, Moroccan kickboxer
Farid Villaume, French Muay Thai kickboxer

Rugby footballers 
Abdelatif Benazzi
Abdellatif Boutaty, rugby union player
Abderazak El Khalouki, French rugby league player
Jamal Fakir, Moroccan-born French rugby league player
Adel Fellous, French rugby league player
Younes Khattabi
Djalil Narjissi
Fouad Yaha, French rugby league player

Racers 
Victor Soussan, Moroccan-born Australian Grand Prix motorcycle racing
Michaël Benyahia, Moroccan-American Open Wheel Race Car Driver, 2017 Formula Renault NEC Champion 2017 Formula Renault Northern European Cup

Rowing 
Moe Sbihi

Ski 
Kenza Tazi, Moroccan-American alpine skier; Olympian
Adam Lamhamedi, Moroccan-Canadian alpine skier; Olympian
Samir Azzimani, Moroccan-French alpine skier; Olympian

Runners 
Abdelhakim Bagy, Moroccan-born French long-distance runner
Abdellah Béhar, Moroccan-born runner specialized in the 5000 metres and cross-country running
Fouad Chouki, French middle-distance runner, specialized in the 1500 metres
Driss El Himer, Moroccan-born long-distance runner
Abderrahim El Haouzy, Moroccan-born French sprinter
Mustapha Essaïd, Moroccan-born French runner who specialized in the 5000 meters
Mohamed Ezzher, Moroccan-born French long-distance runner
Adam Gemili, British sprinter
Brahim Lahlafi, Moroccan former long-distance runner
Driss Maazouzi, Moroccan-born 1500 meters athlete runner
Mohamed Ouaadi, Moroccan-born French long-distance runner who specialized in the marathon
Yamna Oubouhou, Moroccan-born French long-distance runner
Ismaïl Sghyr, French-Moroccan long-distance runner
Mounir Yemmouni, Moroccan-born French middle-distance runner specialized in the 1500 meters

Tennis players 
Karim Alami
Hicham Arazi
Younes El Aynaoui
 Yshai Oliel, Israeli junior tennis player
Lina Qostal

Wrestlers 
Layla El

Volleyball

Writers

Twentieth century 

 Eliette Abécassis, French writer, novelist and playwright
 Leila Abouzeid, Arabic-language novelist
 Mohammed Achaari, writer, poet and politician
 Said Achtouk, poet, musician and songwriter
 Mririda n’Ait Attik (c. 1900–c. 1930), Tashelhit-language poet
 Lotfi Akalay, writer and businessman
 Idriss ibn al-Hassan al-Alami (1925–2007)
 Mohammed ibn Mohammed Alami, poet
 Allal al-Fassi (1910–1974)
 Malika al-Fassi, journalist, playwright, novelist
 Mohammed al-Habib al-Fourkani (1922–2008)
 Abd al-Aziz al-Ghumari (1920–1997)
 Abdullah al-Ghumari (1910–1993)
 Ahmad al-Ghumari (1902–1961)
 Mohammed Abed al-Jabri (1936–2010)
 Ahmad al-Tayyeb Aldj (born 1928)
 Tewfik Allal (born 1947)
 Ahmed al-Madini (born 1949)
 Mohammed al-Makki al-Nasiri (1906–1994)
 Tuhami al-Wazzani (1903–1972)
 Ali ibn Qasim al-Zaqqaq (died 1506)
 Ali Azaykou (1942–2004)
 Latifa Baka, novelist, short story writer
 Muriel Barbery, Moroccan-born French novelist, educator
 Leigh Bardugo, Israeli-born American young adult and fantasy author
 Hafsa Bekri, poet, short story writer, feminist writer
 Abdelmalek Belghiti (1906–2010)
 Abdelkader Benali (born 1975)
 Mehdi Ben Barka (1920–1965)
 Siham Benchekroun, novelist, poet, short story writer
 Rajae Benchemsi, poet, essayist, novelist
 Esther Bendahan, Moroccan-born Spanish non-fiction writer, novelist
 Abdelmajid Benjelloun (1919–1981)
 Abdelmajid Benjelloun (born 1944)
 Tahar Ben Jelloun (born 1944)
 Abdelwahab Benmansour (1920–13 November 2008)
 Mohammed Suerte Bennani (born 1961)
 Mohammed Bennis (born 1948)
 Khnata Bennouna, novelist, short story writer
 Khnata bent Bakkar, dowager sultana, biographer, letter writer
 Mohammed Benzakour (born 1972)
 Mohammed Berrada (born 1938)
 Hafsa Bikri
 Mahi Binebine (born 1959)
 Ali Bourequat
 Ahmed Bouzfour (born 1954)
 Al-Yazid al-Buzidi Bujrafi (1925–2011)
 Mohamed Chafik (born 1926)
 Nadia Chafik, novelist, non-fiction writer, educator
 Driss Ben Hamed Charhadi (1937–1986)
 Isaac Chocrón, Venezuelan economist, playwright and translator
 Sonia Chocrón, Venezuelan poet, novelist, screenwriter and playwright
 Mohamed Choukri (1935–2003)
 Driss Chraïbi (1926–2007)
 Mohammed Daoud (1901–1984)
 Zakya Daoud, French-born Moroccan journalist, magazine editor, non-fiction writer
 Farida Diouri, novelist
 Najat El Hachmi (born 1979)
 Youssouf Amine Elalamy (born 1961)
 Nicole Elgrissy, Moroccan writer and activist
 Mohammed Aziz El-Hababi (1922–1993)
 Najat El Hachmi, Spanish-Moroccan writer
 Allal El Hajjam (born 1948)
 Driss El Khouri
 Edmond Amran El Maleh (1917–2010)
 Mahdi Elmandjra (born 1933)
 Mohammed El-Moustaoui (born 1943)
 Youssef Fadel (born 1949)
 Halima Ferhat
 Éric Fottorino, French writer and journalist
 Abdelkrim Ghallab (1919–2006)
 Soumya Naâmane Guessous, best selling non-fiction writer, sociologist, educator
 Abdallah Guennoun (1910–1989)
 Ali Haddani (1936–2007)
 Badia Hadj Nasser
 Ahmed Harrak Srifi (died 1925)
 Ben Salem Himmich (born 1947)
 Ali Squalli Houssaini (born 1932)
 Salim Jay (born 1951)
 Liz Jensen
 Abderrafi Jouahri (born 1943)
 Abdelkarim Jouiti (born 1962)
 Ahmed Joumari (1939–1995)
 Maati Kabbal
 Maguy Kakon, non-fiction writer, women's rights activist
 Mohammed Kaghat (1942–2001)
 Mohammed Khammar Kanouni (1938–1991)
 Mohammed Khaïr-Eddine (1941–1995)
 Abdelkebir Khatibi (born 1938)
 Rita El Khayat, psychiatrist, publisher, women's rights activist, non-fiction writer
 Abdelfattah Kilito (born 1945)
 Driss Ksikes
 Abdellatif Laabi (born 1942)
 Leila Lahlou, author of the novel Do Not Forget God (1987)
 Mohammed Aziz Lahbabi (1922–1993)
 Abdelrahim Lahbibi (born 1950)
 Laila Lalami, Moroccan-American novelist, essayist
 Wafaa Lamrani, poet
 Abdallah Laroui (born 1933)
 Fouad Laroui (born 1958), Moroccan economist and writer
 Mohammed Leftah (1946–2008)
 Ahmed Lemsih (born 1950)
 Ali Lmrabet (born 1959)
 Zahra Mansouri
 Ahmed Mejjati (1936–1995)
 Saida Menebhi, poet, Marxist activist
 Fatema Mernissi, feminist writer, sociologist
 Mohamed Mrabet (born 1936)
 Mostafa Nissaboury (born 1943)
 Rachid O (born 1970)
 Malika Oufkir, memoirist, author of Stolen Lives: Twenty Years in a Desert Jail
 Touria Oulehri, novelist, critic
 Bachir Qamari (1951–2021)
 Mubarak Rabi (born 1938)
 Mohamed Said Raihani (born 1968)
 Fouzia Rhissassi, educator, women's rights activist, non-fiction writer
 Najima Rhozali, non-fiction writer, politician
 Mohammed Sabila
 Abdelhadi Said (born 1974)
 Thouria Saqqat, children's writer
 Simon Sebag Montefiore
 Tayeb Seddiki (born 1938)
 Ahmed Sefrioui (1915–2004)
 Mohamed Serghini (born 1930)
 Abdelhak Serhane
 Mohamed Sibari (born 1945)
 Hourya Sinaceur, philosopher, non-fiction writer
 Mohammed Allal Sinaceur (born 1941)
 Ali Siqli (born 1932)
 Leïla Slimani, French-Moroccan writer
 Mohammed al-Mokhtar Soussi (1900–1963)
 Abdelkarim Tabbal (born 1931)
 Abdellah Taïa (born 1973)
 Abdelhadi Tazi (1921–2015)
 Mahjoub Tobji (born 1942)
 Ralph de Toledano (1916–2007)
 Abdelkhalek Torres (1910–1970)
 Houcine Toulali (1924–1998)
 Ahmed Toufiq (born 1943)
 Bahaa Trabelsi, novelist, journalist, magazine editor
 Said Yaktine (born 1955)
 Nadia Yassine (born 1958)
 A.B. Yehoshua, Israeli novelist, essayist, and playwright
 Mohamed Zafzaf (1942–2001)
 Mohammed Zniber (1923–1993)
 Abdallah Zrika (born 1953)

Nineteenth century 
 Mohammed ibn Abu al-Qasim al-Sijilmasi (died 1800)
 Mohammed ibn Abd as-Salam ibn Nasir (died 1824)
 Mohammed Ibn Amr (died 1827)
 Thami Mdaghri (died 1856)
 Idriss al-Amraoui (died 1879)
 Ahmad ibn Hamdun ibn al-Hajj (died 1898)
 Abd as-Salam al-Alami (1834–1895)
 Ahmad ibn Khalid al-Nasiri (1835–1897)
 Salomon Berdugo (1854–1906)
 Muhammad ibn al-Qasim al-Badisi (died 1922)
 Mohammed ibn Jaafar al-Kattani (1858–1927)
 Ibn Zaydan (1873–1946)
 Muhammad Ibn al-Habib (1876–1972)
 Ahmed Skirej (1878–1944)
 Abdelkrim al-Khattabi (1882–1963)
 Mohammed Boujendar (1889–1926)
 Mohammed Ben Brahim (1897–1955)

Eighteenth century 
 Mohammed ibn abd al-Wahab al-Ghassani (died 1707)
 Mohammed ibn Qasim ibn Zakur (died 1708)
 Mohammed ibn al-Tayyib al-Alami (died 1722)
 Abd al-Qadir ibn Shaqrun (died after 1727/8)
 Mohammed ibn Zakri al-Fasi (died 1731)
 Ahmed ibn al-Mubarak al-Lamti al-Sijilmasi (died 1741)
 Khnata bent Bakkar (died 1754)
 Ibn al-Wannan (died 1773)
 Ahmed al-Ghazzal (died 1777)
 Abd Allah ibn Azzuz (died 1789)
 Mohammed al-Qadiri (1712–1773)
 David Hassine (1722–1792)
 Abu al-Qasim al-Zayyani (1734–1833)
 Kaddour El Alamy (1742–1850)
 Raphael Berdugo (1747–1821)
 Sulayman al-Hawwat (1747–1816)
 Ahmad ibn Ajiba (1747–1809)
 Mohammed al-Duayf (born 1752)
 Mohammed al-Tayyib ibn Kiran (1758–1812)
 Muhammad al-Arabi al-Darqawi (1760–1823)
 Hamdun ibn al-Hajj al-Fasi (1760–1817)
 Ahmad ibn Idris al-Fasi (1760–1837)
 Suleiman al-Alawi (1760–1822)
 Mohammed al-Harraq (1772–1845)
 Mohammed al-Haik (fl. 1790)
 Mohammed al-Tawdi ibn Suda (1790–1794/5)
 Ahmed al-Salawi (1791–1840)
 Mohammed ibn Idris al-Amrawi (1794–1847)
 Mohammed Akensus (1797–1877)
 Hemmou Talb (18th century)

Seventeenth century
 Saadia Azankot, teacher of Jewish literature to Johann Heinrich Hottinger.
 Isaac Uziel (died 1622)
 Abd al-Rahman al-Tamanarti (died 1650)
 Abu Abdallah Mohammed al-Murabit al-Dila'i (died 1678)
 Mohammed ibn Nasir (1603–1674)
 Mohammed al-Mahdi al-Fasi (1624–1698)
 Mohammed al-Rudani (c. 1627–1683)
 Abu Salim al-Ayyashi (1628–1679)
 Abd al-Rahman al-Fasi (1631–1685)
 Abu Ali al-Hassan al-Yusi (1631–1691)
 Ahmed ibn Nasir (1647–1717)
 Abd as-Salam al-Qadiri (1648–1698)
 Abd al-Wahhab Adarrak (1666–1746)
 Mohammed Awzal (1670–1749)
 Mohammed al-Ifrani (1670–1745)
 Ahmed ibn al-Mubarak al-Lamati (1679–1743)
 Mohammed ibn al-Tayyib (1698–1756)

Sixteenth century
 Abraham ben Solomon
 Ali ibn Qasim al-Zaqqaq (died 1506)
 Abdallah al-Ghazwani (died 1529)
 Abderrahman El Majdoub (died 1569)
 Abu-l-Hasan al-Tamgruti (died 1594/5)
 Ahmed al-Mandjur (1520–1587)
 Abu Abdallah ibn Askar (1529–1578)
 Abul Qasim ibn Mohammed al-Ghassani (1548–1610)
 Abd al-Aziz al-Fishtali (1549–1621)
 Ahmad Ibn al-Qadi (1553–1616)
 Ahmed ibn Abi Mahalli (1559–1613)
 Abraham Azulai (c. 1570–1643)
 Mohammed al-Arbi al-Fasi (1580–1642)
 Abdelaziz al-Maghrawi (c. 1580–1600)
 Ahmed Mohammed al-Maqqari (c. 1591–1632)
 Muhammad Mayyara (1591–1662)
 Abd al-Qadir al-Fasi (1599–1680)
 Al-Masfiwi (16th century)

Fifteenth century
 Abdarrahman al-Makudi (died 1405)
 Muhammad al-Jazuli (died 1465)
 Ibrahim ibn Hilal al-Sijilmasi (died c. 1498)
 Ibn Ghazi al-Miknasi (1437–1513)
 Ahmad Zarruq (1442–1493)
 Leo Africanus (1488–1554)

Fourteenth century
 Abu Mohammed al-Qasim al-Sijilmasi (died 1304)
 Ibn Abi Zar (died c. 1315)
 Abu al-Hassan Ali ibn Mohammed al-Zarwili (died 1319)
 Abd al-Haqq al-Badisi (died after 1322)
 Ibn Shuayb (died 1349)
 Ibn Idhari (beginning of the 14th century)
 Ibn Battuta (1304–1377)
 Mohammed al-Hazmiri (fl. 1320)
 Ibn Juzayy (1321–1357)
 Abu Muqri Mohammed al-Battiwi (fl. 1331)
 Ibn Abbad al-Rundi (1333–1390)
 Abu Yahya ibn al-Sakkak (1335–1415)
 Abd al-Rahman al-Jadiri (1375–1416)
 Ismail ibn al-Ahmar (1387–1406)
 Abu al-Hasan Ali al-Jaznai (14th century)

Thirteenth century
 Ibn al-Yasamin (died 1204)
 Ahmad ibn Munim al-Abdari (died 1228)
 Ibn al-Zayyat al-Tadili (died 1229/30)
 Abd al-Rahman al-Fazazi (died 1230)
 Ali ibn al-Qattan (died 1231)
 Ibn al-Khabbaza (died 1239)
 Abdelaziz al-Malzuzi (died 1298)
 Salih ben Sharif al-Rundi (1204–1285)
 Malik ibn al-Murahhal (1207–1289)
 Ibn abd al-Malik al-Marrakushi (1237–1303)
 Mohammed ibn Hajj al-Abdari al-Fasi (c. 1256–1336)
 Ibn al-Banna al-Marrakushi (1256–1321)
 Mohammed ibn Rushayd (1259–1321)
 Mohammed ibn Adjurrum (1273–1323)
 Abu Ali al-Hasan al-Marrakushi (fl. 1281/2)
 Mohammed al-Abdari al-Hihi (fl. c. 1289)
 Judah ben Nissim (13th century)
Nahum Ma'arabi

Twelfth century
 Ibn Bajjah (died 1138)
 Abu Jafar ibn Atiyya (died 1158)
 Ali ibn Harzihim (died 1163)
 Al-Suhayli (1114–1185)
 Zechariah Aghmati (1120–1195)
 Abu al-Abbas as-Sabti (1129–1204)
 Abu al-Abbas al-Jarawi (1133–1212)
 Abd as-Salam ibn Mashish (1140–1227)
 Mohammed ibn Qasim al-Tamimi (1140/5–1207/8)
 Ibn Dihya al-Kalby (1149–1235)
 Mohammed al-Baydhaq (c. 1150)
 Abu Mohammed Salih (1153–1234)
 Joseph ben Judah of Ceuta (c. 1160–1226)
 Abu al-Abbas al-Azafi (1162–1236)
 Abdelwahid al-Marrakushi (born 1185)
 Abu-l-Hassan ash-Shadhili (1196–1258)
 Abu Bakr al-Hassar (12th century)

Eleventh century
 Abu Imran al-Fasi (died 1038)
 Isaac Alfasi (1013–1103)
 Mohammed ibn Tumart (c. 1080–1130)
 Qadi Ayyad ben Moussa (1083–1149)
 Mohammed al-Idrisi (1099–1165)

Tenth century
 Dunash ben Labrat (920–990), medieval Jewish commentator, poet, and grammarian
 Judah ben David Hayyuj (945–1000)
 David ben Abraham al-Fasi (c. 950–1000)

Crime, offenders or victims 

Hamed Abderrahaman Ahmad, Spanish suspected terrorist
Mohamed Taieb Ahmed, Spanish drug lord trafficking hashish across the Strait of Gibraltar
Samir Azzouz
Said Bahaji
Lalla Batoul, imprisoned and tortured under Sultan Abdelhafid
Racid Belkacem
Nordin Benallal, self-styled "escape king"
Ibrahim Bin Shakaran
Ahmed Bouchiki
Mohammed Bouyeri
Adil Charkaoui, Moroccan-born Canadian citizen arrested under security certificate in 2003
Tarek Dergoul
Malika El Aroud
Nathan Elbaz, 
Nouredine el Fahtni
Farid Essebar
Zakariya Essabar
Younis Mohammad Ibrahim al-Hayyari
Mounir El Motassadeq
Khalil el-Moumni
Ilan Halimi
Jamila M'Barek
Zacarias Moussaoui
Lee Murray
Abdelghani Mzoudi
Abdellah Ouzghar, Moroccan suspected of ties to terrorist organizations
Younes Tsouli, Moroccan-British convicted of incitement of terrorism

See also
Moroccans
List of Morocco-related topics
List of Moroccan Dutch people
List of German people of Moroccan descent
People born in Casablanca
 Pallache family

References

 
Lists of Arabs
Lists of Berber people
Lists of Jews